is a Mexican Spanish colloquial term for someone from downtown  in the state of , Mexico's second-largest city.

Etymology
The word derives from the Nahuatl word , the name of a monetary unit in pre-Columbian times which became most closely associated with the region  which today is Guadalajara.

See also
 Tapatío hot sauce: a brand of hot sauce produced in California.
 C.D. Tapatío:  the official reserve team of Mexican soccer team C.D. Guadalajara.

References 

Guadalajara, Jalisco
Demonyms
Mexican slang